When Dad Married Fury is a 2012 play by David Williamson.

Plot
Two brothers, engineer Ian and arts lecturer Ben, are upset when their father Alan, marries an American woman, Fury, half his age who is a fundamentalist Christian. Ben's wife Laura blames Alan for the suicide of her father. Matters are complicated by Laura's mother Judy, Ian's corporate lawyer wife Sue, Laura and Ben's daughter Adele and her girlfriend Sonya.

Background
Williamson was inspired to write the play by attending a wedding where one of the guests turned up with a new American wife half his age. He was also inspired by reading about unscrupulous financial advisers who operated prior to the GFC.

The play premiered in Perth. After that production, Williamson did some rewrites and moved a character only spoken about in that production to the centre of the action on stage. "It was almost a different play when it opened in Sydney" said Williamson.

References

External links

Review of 2011 Perth production by Australian Stage
Review of 2011 Perth production at Perth Now
Review of 2012 Sydney production by Crikey
Review of 2012 Sydney production at Sydney Morning Herald
Review of 2012 Sydney production at Daily Telegraph
Review of 2012 Sydney production at The Australian
Review of 2014 Brisbane production

Plays by David Williamson
2012 plays